Beal is an unincorporated community in Vincennes Township, Knox County, Indiana.

A post office was established at Beal in 1891, and remained in operation until it was discontinued in 1901.

Geography

References

Unincorporated communities in Knox County, Indiana
Unincorporated communities in Indiana